Nea Figaleia (before 1927: Zουρτσα - Zourtsa) is an historical town in Elis, that since the 2011 local government reform is a part of the municipality of Zacharo, Elis, Peloponnese, Greece. The town was the seat of the municipality of Figaleia until 2011 (Kallikratis Programme). Its average altitude is 480 meters above sea level. It has many churches, among which the predominantly old stone church St. Nicholas. The folklore museum and the community clinic are located along the main road. The main landscape is formed of olive trees and cypresses with a panoramic view towards the Ionian Sea.

History
Zourtsa's settlement probably dates back to the 11th century A.D.. Important document for the Zourtsa's history is the golden seal of Mystras, signed in 1321 by Andronikos II Palaiologos. Zourtsa undertaking a significant role during the Independence War of 1821. It was mentioned by the Turkish traveler Evliya Çelebi who visited the area between 1668 and 1671. He described it as a famous resort, full of springs, vineyards, gardens and 150 stone-built houses. 
The town was renamed Kato Figalia in 1927, and Nea Figaleia in 1976.

Population

See also
List of settlements in Elis

External links
www.zourtsa.gr

References

Populated places in Elis
Zacharo